Frownland is a 2007 American independent film written and directed by Ronald Bronstein. It stars Dore Mann as Keith, a self-described "troll", who sweats and stutters his way through his job as a door-to-door salesman, dubiously selling coupons to assist people affected by multiple sclerosis. The film is populated by a cast of characters as dysfunctional and full of neuroses as Keith. The title comes from the song "Frownland" off the album Trout Mask Replica, by Captain Beefheart (who suffered from multiple sclerosis).

It premiered at South by Southwest in 2007, where it won the Special Jury Prize, and was self-distributed in New York City on March 7, 2008.

Plot summary
The story centers on Keith (Dore Mann), a socially challenged yet self-aware and lonely young man in his late 20s, to get through his days and nights. He is a chain-smoker, a shabby dresser, and makes his living as a door-to-door salesman for dubious coupon booklets. His girlfriend, Laura (Mary Wall), arrives sobbing at his tiny room, sleeps with her face to the wall, sticks him with a push-pin. His flatmate, Charles (Paul Grimstad), agrees to pay the electric bill but doesn't, and verbally abuses him. His "friend" Sandy (David Sandholm) doesn't want Keith to visit and once tricks him into leaving and the other time forces him to.

The film details Keith's ineptitude to the daily life in a span of a few days. "It is full throttle all the way with insecurity, needfulness, loneliness, mistrust, desperation, self-hate, apology and despair."

Cast
 Dore Mann as Keith
 Paul Grimstad as Charles
 David Sandholm as Sandy
 Carmine Marino as Carmine
 Mary Wall (who later became Ronald Bronstein's wife) as Laura

Awards
Frownland Special Jury Award at the important SXSW Festival in Austin, Texas and Best Film Not Playing at a Theater Near You at the Gotham Awards in 2007.

Release
Frownland opened on March 7, 2008, at the IFC Center in New York City, where it was introduced by Lodge Kerrigan, who had previously seen the film at the Maryland Film Festival.

Richard Brody of the New Yorker highly praises the film: " This amazingly accomplished first feature by Ronald Bronstein, made with a crew of four on a scant budget, throbs with energy and vision.... Mann, a distant cousin of Bronstein’s, delivers a transfixing performance; his clenched jaws, squinting eyes, and stifled speech avoid all stereotypes as he brings the character to life from within." Roger Ebert gives the film 3.5 stars out of 4, saying "It centers on an extraordinary performance that plays like an unceasing panic attack. To call it uncompromising is to wish for a better word.... It is full throttle all the way with insecurity, needfulness, loneliness, mistrust, desperation, self-hate, apology and despair."

Home media
The film was released on DVD by Factory 25 on September 29, 2009.
The film was released as part of the Criterion Collection in August 2022.

References

External links
 
 
 

2007 films
American independent films
2000s English-language films
2000s American films